Dioryctria peltieri is a species of snout moth in the genus Dioryctria. It was described by Joseph de Joannis in 1908 and is known from Algeria.

The larvae feed on the cones of Cedrus atlantica species.

References

Moths described in 1908
peltieri
Endemic fauna of Algeria
Moths of Africa